Jacob Eli Goodman (November 15, 1933 – October 10, 2021) was an American geometer who spent most of his career at the City College of New York, where he was professor emeritus.

Research
Together, he and Richard M. Pollack, his long-term collaborator, introduced concepts such as "allowable sequences of permutations" and "wiring diagrams", which have played an important role in discrete geometry, specifically in the study of arrangements of pseudolines and (more generally) oriented matroids. His work with Pollack includes such results as the first nontrivial bounds on the number of order types of polytopes, and a generalization of the Hadwiger transversal theorem to higher dimensions. He and Pollack were the founding editors of the journal Discrete & Computational Geometry.

Goodman was the originator of the "pancake problem", an elementary question on permutations which he published under the pseudonym Harry Dweighter. The problem gave rise to the concept of pancake sorting.

Goodman co-edited the book Handbook of Discrete and Computational Geometry with Joseph O'Rourke.

Music
In 1999, Goodman returned to an old love, musical composition, and in 2002 was founding president of the New York Composers Circle.

Awards
In 2012 he became a fellow of the American Mathematical Society.

Selected publications
.
.
.
.
.

.
.

References 

1933 births
2021 deaths
New York University alumni
Columbia University alumni
City College of New York faculty
Researchers in geometric algorithms
Fellows of the American Mathematical Society
People from Lynn, Massachusetts